This alphabetical list of country rock bands and artists covers a wide variety of subgenres.

The year following the artist's name is the first year of the artist's musical career.

A
Alabama (1976)
Jason Aldean (2005)
The Allman Brothers Band (1969)
Amazing Rhythm Aces (1974)
Atlanta Rhythm Section (1971)

B
The Bacon Brothers (1995)
The Band (1964)
The Band Perry (2005)
Casey Barnes (2006)
Big & Rich (1998)
Blackberry Smoke (2000)
Blackfoot (1972)
Blue Rodeo (1984)
BR549 (1993)
Brothers Osborne
Buffalo Springfield (1966)
Jimmy Buffett (1965)
The Byrds (1964)

C
The Cadillac Three (Current)
Glen Campbell (1958)
Johnny Cash (1954)
The Chicks (1997)
Eric Church (2004)
Gene Clark (1963)
Cold Creek County (2013)
Commander Cody and His Lost Planet Airmen (1967)
Ry Cooder (1967)
Cowboy (1969)
Billy "Crash" Craddock (1957)
Crazy Horse (1971)
Creedence Clearwater Revival (1968)
Crosby, Stills & Nash (1969)
Cross Canadian Ragweed (1994)
Sheryl Crow (1987)

D
D.A.D. (1982)
Charlie Daniels (1958)
Mac Davis (1968)
Travis Denning (2012)
The Desert Rose Band (1985)
The Doobie Brothers (1970)
Dr. Hook (1967)
Bob Dylan (1961)

E
Eagles (1971)
Steve Earle (1974)
The Everly Brothers  (1957)

F
Fifth on the Floor (2006)
Firefall  (1974)
The Flying Burrito Brothers (1968)
John Fogerty (1973)
Free Beer  (1975)

G
Brantley Gilbert (2005)
Gin Blossoms (1987)
Goose Creek Symphony (1968)
The Grateful Dead (1965)

H
Hardy (2018)
Emmylou Harris (1969)
John Hiatt (1972)
Hootie and the Blowfish (1986)

I
The International Submarine Band (1966)

J
Shooter Jennings (1996)
Waylon Jennings (1958)

K
The Kentucky Headhunters (1968)
Kid Rock (1988)
Chris Knight (1998)
Kris Kristofferson (1970)

L
Griffin Layne (2007)
Aaron Lewis (1990)
Jerry Lee Lewis (1954)
Gordon Lightfoot (1958)
Little Feat (1969)
Loggins and Messina (1971)
The Long Ryders (1982)
The Los Dos Bros (1992)
Nick Lowe (1966)
Lynyrd Skynyrd (1965)

M
Cory Marks (2014)
The Marshall Tucker Band (1972)
Martina McBride (1991)
Tim McGraw (1990)
Jason Charles Miller (2009)
Montgomery Gentry (1999)
Justin Moore (2009)
Kip Moore (2008)
Michael Martin Murphey (1972)

N
Nashville West (1967)
Ricky Nelson (1957)
Willie Nelson (1973)
Michael Nesmith (1965)
The New Riders of the Purple Sage (1969)
The Nitty Gritty Dirt Band (1966)
Ted Nugent (1958)

O
The Outlaws (1967)
The Ozark Mountain Daredevils (1972)

P
Brad Paisley (1999)
Gram Parsons (1963)
Pirates of the Mississippi (1987)
Poco (1968)
Elvis Presley (1953)
Mason Proffit (1969)
Pure Prairie League (1970)

R
Eddie Rabbitt (1964)
Rascal Flatts (1999)
Reckless Kelly (1997)
The Rockingbirds (1990)
Rocky and the Natives (2011)
Kenny Rogers (1958)
Linda Ronstadt (1967)
Darius Rucker (1986)

S
Dallas Smith (1999)
Shocking Blue (1969)
Social Distortion (1978)
J.D. Souther (1972)
Souther-Hillman-Furay Band (1973)
Southern Pacific (1983)
Chris Stapleton (2001)
Sugarland (2003)
Taylor Swift (2010)

T
A Thousand Horses (2010)
The Tractors (1993)
Travis Tritt (1989)
Steven Tyler (1975)

U
Uncle Kracker (1999)
Carrie Underwood (2005)
Keith Urban (1990)

W
Jerry Jeff Walker (1971)
Warumpi Band (1980)
Clarence White (1954)
The Whybirds (2006)
Wilco (1994)
Hank Williams, Jr. (1957)
Hank Williams III (1991)
The Wolverines (1994)
Bob Woodruff (1994)

Y
Neil Young (1966)

Z
Zac Brown Band (2002)

References

Country rock
 
Rock
Lists of rock musicians